Richard Thornhill Tudor (born 27 September 1948) is a former English cricketer.  Tudor was a right-handed batsman who bowled right-arm medium pace.  He was born in Shrewsbury, Shropshire and educated at Shrewsbury School.

Tudor made his only first-class appearance for Warwickshire against Cambridge University in 1976.  In this match, he bowled a total of fifteen wicket-less overs.  He did not bat in Warwickshire's first-innings, but in the second innings he was promoted to open, scoring 6 runs before being dismissed by Charles Bannister. He made no further appearances for Warwickshire.

Before and after playing for Warwickshire, Tudor played Minor counties cricket for Shropshire, making his debut for the county in the 1975 Minor Counties Championship against Durham.  He played Minor counties cricket for Shropshire from 1975 to 1977, making nine appearances.

References

External links
Richard Tudor at ESPNcricinfo
Richard Tudor at CricketArchive

1948 births
Living people
Sportspeople from Shrewsbury
English cricketers
Shropshire cricketers
Warwickshire cricketers